Encelia californica is a species of flowering plant in the family Asteraceae known by the common name California brittlebush. It is also commonly referred to as California coast sunflower and California bush sunflower.

Distribution
This  shrub is native to southern California (U.S.) and northern Baja California (México). It is a member of the coastal sage plant community at the shoreline, and the chaparral and woodlands plant community on inland foothills in the Transverse and Peninsular Ranges.

Description
Encelia californica is a bushy shrub that reaches between 50–150  cm (20-60 inches) in height. It has many thin branches covered in widely spaced green leaves which are a rounded diamond shape.

The solitary flower heads are daisy like, with 15 to 25 bright yellow ray florets 1 to 3 centimeters long around a center of protruding yellowish to purplish brown disc florets.

The fruit is an achene 5 to 7 millimeters long, with no pappus.  It blooms from February to June, and attracts butterflies, bees, and other insects.

Uses
It is a host plant for the larvae of the Bay checkerspot butterfly, a threatened species.

Encelia californica is cultivated by specialty nurseries as an ornamental plant, for use in native plant and wildlife gardens, and natural landscaping projects.  It is drought tolerant but not frost tolerant, and needs full sun.

References

External links
 Calflora Database: Encelia californica (California brittlebush, Bush sunflower)
Jepson Manual eFlora (TJM2) treatment of Encelia californica
USDA Plants Profile for Encelia californica (California brittlebush)
UC Calphotos gallery of Encelia californica (California brittlebush)

californica
Flora of California
Flora of Baja California
Natural history of the California chaparral and woodlands
Natural history of the Channel Islands of California
Natural history of the Peninsular Ranges
Natural history of the Santa Monica Mountains
Natural history of the Transverse Ranges
Plants described in 1841
Taxa named by Thomas Nuttall
Garden plants of North America
Drought-tolerant plants
Flora without expected TNC conservation status